The Glattzentrum, more formally known as the Einkaufszentrum Glatt or Glatt shopping centre, is a shopping mall located in the Glatt Valley close to the Swiss city of Zurich. Politically, the mall is situated in the municipality of Wallisellen.

The mall was opened in 1975, being modeled on similar malls in the United States. Like its US progenitors, the mall was intended to be accessed by car, and it is located close to the A1 motorway and provides spacious car parking. In 2010, phase 2 of the Stadtbahn Glattal opened, including an elevated tram stop linked to the mall by a footbridge. Before that the public transportation connections were limited to three bus lines (nr. 94, 759 and 787) connecting the center to the railway stations Zürich Airport, Zürich Oerlikon, Dübendorf, Wallisellen and Dietlikon.

When built, the mall was jointly owned by the Migros, Globus and Jelmoli groups, each of which operated an anchor store within the centre. Today the mall is owned by Swiss Life. The Migros store still exists, as does the (now Migros owned) Globus store, but Jelmoli no longer has any involvement. In addition to the two remaining anchor stores, there are four specialty markets, five restaurants, four bars and 90 specialty shops.

In front of Glattzentrum is the newly built open-air Richti shopping center.

References

External links 
 
 Official web site

Buildings and structures in the canton of Zürich
Shopping malls in Switzerland
Migros